Neurofunk (also known informally as neuro) is a dark subgenre of drum and bass which emerged between 1997 and 1998 in London, England as a progression of techstep. It was further developed by juxtaposing elements of darker, heavier, and harder forms of funk with multiple influences ranging from techno, house and jazz, distinguished by consecutive stabs over the bassline; razor-sharp backbeats; scarce or nonexistent traditional melodies; a hyper focus on sub sound design; the use of modulated, distorted and filtered synthesizers and audio capture from samplers such as the Akai S1000 and Emu E6400. Neurofunk is very closely related to Techstep, but the primary characteristic that distinguishes the two genres is Neurofunk has more emphasis on flowing complex rhythms using processed and enhanced sampled breakbeats/percussion and expressive, distorted, filtered and modulated bass sounds overlaid with rich layered soundscapes and percussive stab sounds. Neurofunk, as described by Musicmap creator Kwinten Crauwels, "sounds like the natural soundtrack of the brain: neurological chemicals flowing and rushing, creating both deeply obscure and delicate emotions."

History 
The first sounds of neurofunk emerged from techstep within the larger musical genre of drum and bass and jungle during the late nineties. Techstep garnered a name for itself during the mid-nineties when rave (especially in the UK) was dying out, and amassed popularity quickly.

Neurofunk's early evolution – when diverging from techstep – can be heard on Ed Rush and Optical's Funktion (1997) single for V Recordings, as well as on their first album Wormhole (1998) for Virus Recordings.

The first known mention of the term was in the book Energy Flash: A Journey Through Rave Music and Dance Culture (1998) by Simon Reynolds. This is where the English music critic coined the name as a result of his personal perception of stylistic shifts in techstep – backbeats replacing breakbeats, funk harmonies replacing industrial timbres, and lack of emphasis on the drop: "(Neurofunk) is the fun-free culmination of jungle's strategy of cultural resistance: the eroticization of anxiety."

References

Drum and bass subgenres
English styles of music